John Robert Brown may refer to:

John Robert Brown (Virginia politician) (1842–1927), United States representative from Virginia
John Robert Brown (judge) (1909–1993), member of the United States Court of Appeals for the Fifth Circuit, noted for his key decisions in favor of civil rights
John Robert Brown (British Columbia politician) (1862–1947), lawyer and politician in British Columbia, Canada

See also
John Brown (disambiguation)